The 1969 Buffalo Bills season was the team’s tenth season, and was the final season of the American Football League before the 1970 AFL-NFL Merger. The Bills played an AFL-record seven games against opponents that went on to reach the postseason; Buffalo lost all seven of these games.

This was the rookie season for running back O. J. Simpson, the Heisman Trophy winner from Southern California and first overall selection in the draft, who went on to a Hall of Fame career.

Although Buffalo only won four games, their penultimate win—a Week Ten victory against the Miami Dolphins—would be their last victory against the Dolphins until the 1980 season. After the win, the Bills suffered against Miami an NFL-record twenty consecutive games lost by one team to another.

Offseason
August 9, 1969: O. J. Simpson signs a four-year contract worth $215,000.
August 20, 1969: The Bills acquired wide receiver Marlin Briscoe.
August 25, 1969: Guard George Flint and defensive tackle Tom Sestak both announced their retirements.
August 25, 1969: Running back/returner Ed Rutkowski was released by the Bills.

Draft

Personnel

Coaches/Staff

Source: https://pro-football-history.com/franchise/7/buffalo-bills-coaches

Final roster

Preseason

Regular season

Schedule

Week 1

Week 2

Week 3

Week 4

Week 5

Week 6

Week 7

Week 8

Week 9

Week 10

    
    
    
    
    

O. J. Simpson 72 Rush Yds, 81 Rec Yds

Week 11

Week 12

Week 13

Week 14

Standings

This was the final year of the AFL The Baltimore Colts would join the AFL eastern teams and become the AFC East in 1970.

Awards and records

References

Buffalo Bills on Pro Football Reference
Buffalo Bills on jt-sw.com

Buffalo Bills
Buffalo Bills seasons
Buffalo